Ruth Cyril (1920 – 1988), also known as B. Cyril,  was an American printmaker.

Early life
She was born Ruth Goldfarb on 1920 in New York City. Her date of birth is reported variously as 1920 or 1938, likely as a result of her name change to Cyril.

She studied at Greenwich House Art School, the School of Contemporary Art, New York University, The New School and the Art Students League of New York.

Art career
Cyril was a member of the Society of American Graphic Artists and the New York printmakers' group Atelier 17. Her work is included in the collections of the Seattle Art Museum, the National Gallery of Art, Washington, the Victoria and Albert Museum, London,  the Art Institute of Chicago the Metropolitan Museum of Art, New York, the Indianapolis Museum of Art, and the Albright Knox Art Gallery.

References

1920 births
1988 deaths
20th-century American women artists
20th-century American printmakers
Atelier 17 alumni
American women printmakers